Elephantorrhiza is a genus of flowering plants in the family Fabaceae.

It has the following species:
 Elephantorrhiza burkei Benth. 
 Elephantorrhiza elephantina (Burch.) Skeels 	
 Elephantorrhiza goetzei (Harms) Harms
 Elephantorrhiza obliqua Burtt Davy
 Elephantorrhiza praetermissa J.H.Ross
 Elephantorrhiza schinziana Dinter
 Elephantorrhiza suffruticosa Schinz
 Elephantorrhiza woodii E.Phillips

References

Mimosoids
Fabaceae genera
Taxonomy articles created by Polbot